The Dallara IPS is an open-wheel formula racing car chassis, designed, developed and built by Italian manufacturer Dallara, for the one-make Indy Lights spec-series, a feeder-series for the IndyCar Series, between 2002 and 2014.

References

Open wheel racing cars
Indy Lights
Dallara racing cars